The Macinnes's mouse-tailed bat (Rhinopoma macinnesi) is a species of bat in the Rhinopomatidae family. It is found in Ethiopia, Kenya, Somalia, and Uganda. Its natural habitats are subtropical or tropical dry shrubland, and hot and temperate deserts.

References

Rhinopomatidae
Mammals described in 1937
Taxonomy articles created by Polbot
Bats of Africa